James Paul Marsden (born September 18, 1973)  is an American actor, singer, former model and voice actor. Marsden began his acting career by guest starring in the television shows Saved by the Bell: The New Class (1993), Touched by an Angel (1995), Party of Five (1995), and miniseries Bella Mafia (1997). He gained prominence in the early 2000s with his portrayal of Scott Summers / Cyclops in the X-Men film series (2000–2014), and starred in Superman Returns (2006). Other works during this period include The Notebook (2004), 10th & Wolf (2006), and The Alibi (2006).

Following his breakthrough in comic book films, Marsden went on to star in various genre films, including Hairspray (2007), which was a critical and commercial success and won many awards for its ensemble cast. As Corny Collins, he sang two songs for the film's soundtrack which has been certified Platinum by the RIAA.  He subsequently appeared in the films Sex Drive (2008), The Box (2009), and Straw Dogs (2011). Marsden has also had starring roles in family-friendly films such as Enchanted (2007),  Hop (2011), and Disenchanted (2022), and leading roles in 27 Dresses (2008), The Best of Me (2014), and Tom Wachowski in Sonic the Hedgehog (2020) and Sonic the Hedgehog 2 (2022).

In 2012, Marsden starred in a range of independent films such as Small Apartments, Bachelorette, and Robot & Frank. He later returned to television guest-starring in Modern Family (2011), and playing Liz Lemon's love interest, Criss Chros in 30 Rock (2012–2013) in a supporting role. In 2013, Marsden portrayed President John F. Kennedy in Lee Daniels's The Butler, and had a supporting role in Anchorman 2: The Legend Continues. He starred as gunslinging sentient android Teddy Flood in the first two seasons HBO science fiction series Westworld (2016–2022), a role he reprised in the fourth season. Since 2019, Marsden has starred as Steve and Ben Wood in the Netflix black comedy series Dead to Me. In 2020, Marsden played Stu Redman in the Paramount+ miniseries The Stand. He also has a role in Netflix's upcoming film Unfrosted: The Pop-Tart Story.

Early life and family
Marsden was born in Stillwater, Oklahoma on September 18, 1973, the son of Kathleen (née Scholtz) and James Luther Marsden. His father, a food safety advisor to LexiGene Industries, and his mother, a nutritionist, divorced when he was nine years old.

He has four siblings: two younger sisters and two brothers. He attended Hefner Middle School and Putnam City North High School, in Oklahoma City, and later went on to attend Oklahoma State University, where he studied broadcast journalism. He was also a member of Delta Tau Delta fraternity. Marsden left after one and a half years, opting instead to move to Los Angeles in order to pursue his acting career.

Career

Debut and early career (1994–2003)
Marsden got his first job in a series of episodes of The Nanny as Eddie, Margaret Sheffield's boyfriend. He then starred in the Canadian television series Boogies Diner, which aired for one season. Following the end of that series, he guest starred on television shows such as Saved by the Bell: The New Class and Party of Five. He later starred in the ABC show Second Noah. He lost out to Edward Norton for a role in Primal Fear and auditioned for the lead role in 54, which then went to Ryan Phillippe. He starred in the films Disturbing Behavior opposite Katie Holmes and Gossip opposite Kate Hudson. He also appeared in the television series Ally McBeal as one of the main cast members during the first half of season 5, where he also sang. He also starred in a 1998 episode of "The Outer Limits".

Marsden was cast as Cyclops in the X-Men films. His character is prominent in the comics; his screen time in the films, however, is reduced in the sequels. Marsden also appeared in Bryan Singer's Superman Returns. Singer had dropped out of the third X-Men film to direct Superman and Marsden was cast as Lois Lane's fiancé, Richard White. Due to schedule conflicts, Marsden's screen time in X-Men: The Last Stand was reduced, stirring controversy from fans of the comics. Marsden's portrayal of Cyclops in the films was well received and garnered him a Blockbuster Award for Best Supporting Actor. In 2014 Marsden reprised his role of Cyclops in a brief cameo for X-Men: Days of Future Past, as did other actors from the first film including Anna Paquin and Famke Janssen.

Breakthrough with comedy films (2004–2011)
In 2004, Marsden co-starred with Rachel McAdams, Ryan Gosling, James Garner, and Gena Rowlands in the romantic drama The Notebook as Lon Hammond, Jr., the second man Allie Hamilton (McAdams) falls in love with. In 2007, Marsden played Corny Collins in the film adaptation of the Broadway musical Hairspray, based on the 1988 John Waters film of the same name. In the film, he sang two songs, "The Nicest Kids In Town" and "(It's) Hairspray." Both Hairspray and its soundtrack were critically acclaimed, the latter of which has since sold over 1,200,000 copies to date in the United States and was certified Platinum by the RIAA. His next role was with Amy Adams in the Disney hybrid animated/live action film Enchanted, playing Prince Edward. He sang one song as a duet with Adams at the beginning of the film and a duet with Idina Menzel that was cut from the film. Enchanted was well received critically and proved to be a commercial success, earning more than $340 million worldwide at the box office.

Following his successes in 2007's Hairspray and Enchanted, Marsden played the male lead in the 2008 romantic comedy 27 Dresses opposite star Katherine Heigl, which grossed $160 million worldwide. He also starred in the teen comedy Sex Drive. Though the film was a moderate success, Marsden's performance was heavily praised. Marsden also received a Teen Choice Awards nomination for Choice Movie Actor in a Comedy for his roles in Enchanted and 27 Dresses.

In 2009, Marsden also played the male lead in the film The Box, based on the 1970 short story "Button, Button" by author Richard Matheson, which was earlier made into an episode of The Twilight Zone. He starred opposite Cameron Diaz and reunited with Superman Returns co-star Frank Langella. In 2010, Marsden was cast in the comedy Death at a Funeral, a remake of the 2007 British film of the same name, along with Chris Rock, Luke Wilson, Danny Glover, and Columbus Short.

Marsden made an appearance on Modern Family in January 2011, playing a squatter. In April, Marsden appeared as the male (live-action) lead in Hop, an Easter-themed comedy co-starring Russell Brand as the Easter Bunny. Although the film was considered a commercial success, opening at the top of the weekend box office and grossing over $100 million in the U.S. box office, Hop generally received negative reviews. Later in 2011, Marsden played the lead in Straw Dogs, a remake of Sam Peckinpah's 1971 film; Marsden portrayed the character played by Dustin Hoffman in the original. Straw Dogs reunited Marsden with his Superman Returns co-star Kate Bosworth. The film received mixed reviews and ultimately ended up being a box office flop.

Transition to independent films and supporting work (2012–present)

In 2012 and 2013, Marsden appeared in a recurring role in the sixth and seventh seasons of 30 Rock, playing Criss Chros, the boyfriend (and later husband) of the series' main character Liz Lemon. He also appeared in several independent films, including Robot & Frank, Small Apartments, Bachelorette, and As Cool as I Am. In 2013, he co-starred with Denzel Washington and Mark Wahlberg in the action film 2 Guns, which debuted at number one in its weekend release. Soon after, he starred in Lee Daniels' historical drama The Butler as President John F. Kennedy. The film, featuring an ensemble, opened at the top spot and received positive reviews. Marsden played Jack Lime, a rival reporter to Will Ferrell's Ron Burgundy, in Anchorman 2: The Legend Continues. The following year, he reprised his role as Scott Summers for the first time in eight years in X-Men: Days of Future Past in a cameo. He would also star in his second Nicholas Sparks film titled The Best of Me, replacing Paul Walker in the lead role. Marsden has recently played the character of sentient android Teddy Flood in HBO's 2016 series Westworld.

Marsden appeared as Judy Hale's former boyfriend and lawyer Steve Wood in the Netflix dark comedy series Dead to Me. He later starred in a separate role in the same series as Ben Wood from the second season onward. In 2020, he starred in Paramount's Sonic the Hedgehog film and the CBS All Access television miniseries The Stand. Marsden also starred in the FX miniseries Mrs. America as Phil Crane. In 2021, Marsden provided the voice of Hitch Trailblazer in the Netflix animated film My Little Pony: A New Generation. Marsden reprised his role of Tom Wachowski in the 2022 sequel Sonic the Hedgehog 2. He also reprised the role of Edward in the sequel to Enchanted, titled Disenchanted, which was released on Disney+ in November 2022.

Personal life
Marsden married Mary Elizabeth "Lisa" Linde, daughter of Dennis Linde, on July 22, 2000. The couple have two children: a son born in 2001 and a daughter born in 2005. They divorced in 2011, with Linde citing irreconcilable differences.

He also has a son, born in 2012, with his former girlfriend Rose Costa.

Filmography

Film

Television

Music videos

Discography

Awards and nominations

References

External links

 
 Interview on The Notebook and X-Men 3

1973 births
Male actors from Oklahoma
American male film actors
American crooners
Male models from Oklahoma
American male television actors
American male voice actors
Living people
Oklahoma State University alumni
People from Stillwater, Oklahoma
20th-century American male actors
21st-century American male actors
21st-century American singers
21st-century American male singers